Central London is the innermost part of London, in England, spanning several boroughs.  Over time, a number of definitions have been used to define the scope of Central London for statistics, urban planning and local government.  Its characteristics are understood to include a high density built environment, high land values, an elevated daytime population and a concentration of regionally, nationally and internationally significant organisations and facilities.

Road distances to London are traditionally measured from a central point at Charing Cross (in the City of Westminster), which is marked by the statue of King Charles I at the junction of the Strand, Whitehall and Cockspur Street, just south of Trafalgar Square.

Characteristics

Definitions

London Plan

The London Plan defines the 'Central Activities Zone' policy area, which comprises the City of London, most of Westminster and the inner parts of Camden, Islington, Hackney, Tower Hamlets, Southwark, Lambeth, Kensington & Chelsea and Wandsworth. It is described as "a unique cluster of vitally important activities including central government offices, headquarters and embassies, the largest concentration of London's financial and business services sector and the offices of trade, professional bodies, institutions, associations, communications, publishing, advertising and the media".

For strategic planning, since 2011 there has been a Central London sub-region comprising the boroughs of Camden, Islington, Kensington and Chelsea, Lambeth, Southwark, Westminster and the City of London. From 2004 to 2008, the London Plan included a sub-region called Central London comprising Camden, Islington, Kensington and Chelsea, Lambeth, Southwark, Wandsworth and Westminster. It had a 2001 population of 1,525,000. The sub-region was replaced in 2008 with a new structure which amalgamated inner and outer boroughs together. This was altered in 2011 when a new Central London sub-region was created, now including the City of London and excluding Wandsworth. However, districts at the outer edge of this subregion such as Highgate, Archway, Streatham and Dulwich are not generally considered as Central London.

1901 Census
The 1901 Census defined Central London as the City of London and the metropolitan boroughs of Bermondsey, Bethnal Green, Finsbury, Holborn, Shoreditch, Southwark, Stepney, St Marylebone and Westminster.

1959–1963 proposals for a central London borough
During the Herbert Commission and the subsequent passage of the London Government Bill, three unsuccessful attempts were made to define an area that would form a central London borough. The first two were detailed in the 1959 Memorandum of Evidence of the Greater London Group of the London School of Economics.

"Scheme A" envisaged a central London borough, one of 25, consisting of the City of London, Westminster, Holborn, Finsbury and the inner parts of St Marylebone, St Pancras, Chelsea, Southwark and Lambeth. The boundary deviated from existing lines to include all central London railway stations, the Tower of London and the museums, such that it included small parts of Kensington, Shoreditch, Stepney and Bermondsey. It had an estimated population of 350,000 and occupied .

"Scheme B" delineated central London, as one of 7 boroughs, including most of the City of London, the whole of Finsbury and Holborn, most of Westminster and Southwark, parts of St Pancras, St Marylebone, Paddington and a small part of Kensington. The area had an estimated population of 400,000 and occupied .

During the passage of the London Government Bill an amendment was put forward to create a central borough corresponding to the definition used at the 1961 census. It consisted of the City of London, all of Westminster, Holborn and Finsbury; and the inner parts of Shoreditch, Stepney, Bermondsey, Southwark, Lambeth, Chelsea, Kensington, Paddington, St Marylebone and St Pancras. The population was estimated to be 270,000.

See also 

 Inner London
 Outer London

References

London sub-regions
Areas of London
Geography of London